Conrad, Count von Reventlow (21 April 1644 – 21 July 1708) was a Danish statesman who was "Grand Chancellor of Denmark", a predecessor title of the Prime Minister of Denmark, from 1699 until his death. His chancellorship occurred during the reign of King Frederick IV.

Early life
Conrad von Reventlow was the son of Chancellor Ditlev von Reventlow (1660–1664) and his wife, Christine zu Rantzau (1618-1688). He was the brother of chamberlain Count Henning von Reventlow (1640–1705) and Chancellor, Count Ditlev von Reventlow (1654–1701).

Military career
He attended  Academy in Sorø Academy and   studied at the University of Orleans (1662). After attending university, Reventlow was called to the Danish Court in 1665, where he rose through various positions of responsibility. In the 1670s, he became a colonel in the Danish military. He recruited a regiment and distinguished himself in the Scanian War	(1675–1679).

In 1700, Reventlow was deeply involved in the negotiations for peace with Sweden during that country's naval blockade of Copenhagen, an early event in the Great Northern War. Both France and the United Kingdom dealt extensively with Reventlow in their efforts to pressure Denmark to declare peace, in order to prevent a wider war from spreading into Europe.

Councillor and Grand Chancellor
In 1672, he became a land commissioner in Schleswig-Holstein. In 1685, Reventlow used his influence as a councilor to the court on behalf of privateer Benjamin Raule (1634-1707), to promote Danish acquisition of the island of St. Thomas in the West Indies.

In 1678, he applied for leave from service when his wife was incurably ill.

Family
He married twice; with his first wife, Countess Anna Margarethe Gabel (1651-1678), he had:
 Christian Detlev, who played a prominent political role
 Christine Sophie (1672-1757) became an influential advisor to her sister and brother-in-law, the Danish queen and king.

With his second wife, Sophie Amalie Hahn of Seekapm (1664-1722), he had:
 Anne Margrethe (1682–1710), married Hans Schack, 2nd Count of Schackenborg
 Ulrikke Eleonor (1690-1754), married Count Ferdinand Anton Gyldenløve, a grandson of King Frederick III by his mistress, Margrethe Pape
 Anna Sophie (1693-1743), married Frederick IV in 1721, becoming the first modern Queen of Denmark not to have been born a princess.

His sarcophagus in the Schleswig Cathedral (Schleswiger Dom) was designed by the renowned sculptor Thomas Quellinus.

Ancestry

References

Additional sources
Jirí Louda and Michael MacLagan, Lines of Succession: Heraldry of the Royal Families of Europe, 2nd edition (London, U.K.: Little, Brown and Company, 1999), table 19.

External links
Kannegaard and Skeel Family Tree of Greve Conrad Reventlow.

1644 births
1708 deaths
17th-century Danish people
Conrad
University of Orléans alumni